Arthur William Tattersall (21 April 1876 – 26 June 1962) was an Australian politician.

He was born in Launceston. In 1947 he was elected to the Tasmanian Legislative Council as the independent member for West Devon, serving until his retirement in 1953. Tattersall died in Wynyard in 1962.

References

1876 births
1962 deaths
Independent members of the Parliament of Tasmania
Members of the Tasmanian Legislative Council